Latin nationalism may refer to:

Pan-Latinism
Panhispanism
Ethnic nationalism